Kamalika Banerjee or Kamalika Bandyopadhyay is a Bengali film and television actress.

Works

Films

Television 
 Checkmate as Dr. Banalata Sen
 Ekhane Aakash Neel as Basabdatta 
 Behula on Star Jalsha as Sumitra Behula's mother
 Chokher Tara Tui as Jaya / Payel 
Ishti Kutum  as Sharmila 
 Rajjotok as Sumi
 Japani Toy as Minister Wife
 Uma as Uma main actress, lead role
 Ek Akasher Niche as Gayatri/Chhutki
 Agnipariksha as Jayanti 
Basanta Bilas Messbari
  Umar Shongshar  as Uma

References

External links 
 

Living people
Indian television actresses
Actresses in Bengali cinema
Indian film actresses
21st-century Indian actresses
Bigg Boss Bangla contestants
Year of birth missing (living people)